Cycling at the 2014 Asian Games was held in Incheon, South Korea. Road bicycle racing was held at the Songdo Road Cycling Course from September 27 to 28, while track cycling was contested at Incheon International Velodrome from September 20 to 25, and mountain biking was contested at Yeongjong Baegunsan MTB Course on September 30, and BMX racing was contested at the Ganghwa Asiad BMX Track on October 1.

Schedule

Medalists

BMX

Mountain bike

Road

Track

Medal table

Participating nations
A total of 224 athletes from 32 nations competed in athletics at the 2014 Asian Games:

References

External links 
 BMX
 Mountain Bike
 Road
 Track

 
2014
2014 Asian Games events
Asian Games
2014 Asian Games